Dolní Břežany is a municipality and village in Prague-West District in the Central Bohemian Region of the Czech Republic. It has about 4,400 inhabitants.

Administrative parts
Villages of Jarov, Lhota and Zálepy are administrative parts of Dolní Břežany.

Geography
Dolní Břežany is located south of Prague, in its immediate vicinity. Most of the municipal territory lies in the Prague Plateau. The Vltava River flows along the western municipal border. The Břežanský Brook flows across the municipality into the Vltava and supplies several small ponds.

History
The first written mention of Břežany is from 1332. In 1364, Břežany and Lhota were acquired by the bishopric in Litomyšl, then they were owned by the Zbraslav Monastery. In 1436, King Sigismund pledged the estate to Bened of Nečtiny. Then the owners changed frequently. Between 1627 and 1632, the village changed its name to Dolní Břežany. From 1683 to 1715, Dolní Břežany was property of the Trauttmansdorff family, who sold it to the Prague archbishopric. The Prague archbishops owned it until 1945.

Sights
The landmark of Dolní Břežany is a Renaissance castle, which was created by rebuilding a medieval fortress. It was built during the rule of Krištof Želínský of Sebuzín between 1590 and 1606. The castle chapel was added in the 1880s. Today it serves as a hotel.

There are the remains of a Celtic oppidum on the Závist hill. A wooden observation tower was built in the area in 2021.

Notable people
Eduard Prchal (1911–1984), pilot

References

External links

Villages in Prague-West District